Algiers is an unincorporated community in Jefferson Township, Pike County, in the U.S. state of Indiana.

History
Algiers was laid out in 1868. The community was named after Algiers, the capital of Algeria. An old variant name of the community was called Delectible.

Homer E. Capehart, a U.S. Senator from Indiana and a pioneer in the jukebox and record player industry was born in Algiers in 1897, the son of a local tenant farmer.

A post office called Algiers was established in 1885, and remained in operation until it was discontinued in 1955.

The town's name is part of the namesake of the Algers, Winslow and Western Railway which operates within Pike County.

Geography

References

Unincorporated communities in Pike County, Indiana
Unincorporated communities in Indiana